San José Iturbide is a Mexican city (and municipality) located in the Northeast region of the state of Guanajuato, within the Sierra Gorda range. It is named in honor of Saint Joseph and the first Emperor of Mexico, Agustín de Iturbide. The municipality has an area of 534.11 square kilometres (1.76% of the surface of the state) and is bordered to the north by San Luis de la Paz and Doctor Mora, to the east by Tierra Blanca, to the south by the state of Querétaro, and to the west by San Miguel de Allende. The municipality had a population of 54,661 inhabitants according to the 2005 census.

The municipal president of San José Iturbide is Arq. Jose Geronimo Robles Gutierrez

Climate

References

External links
Gobierno San José Iturbide (in Spanish)

Municipalities of Guanajuato
Populated places in Guanajuato